The Constant Vanden Stock Stadium, also known as the Lotto Park for sponsorship reasons, is a football stadium in the municipality of Anderlecht in Brussels, Belgium. It is home to R.S.C. Anderlecht. It also hosted the UEFA Euro 1972 semi-final between Hungary and the Soviet Union, as well as several games of the Belgium national football team.

History

Early history
In 1917, R.S.C. Anderlecht installed, on the border of the Meir Park (later renamed Astrid Park), a new stadium with only one wooden stand. It was originally called the Émile Versé Stadium, after the industrialist Émile Versé, a generous patron of the club. Later, concrete stands were set up.

Between 1983 and 1991, the stadium was completely rebuilt and renamed the Constant Vanden Stock Stadium, after the club's then-chairman, Constant Vanden Stock.

21st century
In 2010, the son of Constant Vanden Stock, Roger, announced together with RSC Anderlecht's manager Herman Van Holsbeeck that the club was going to build a third ring above the two existing ones in order to increase the stadium's capacity to 30,000 places. As of 2022, these works have not started, and it is doubtful they will, as in 2014 Anderlecht agreed to become anchor tenant of the planned 60,000+ new national stadium, thus sealing the fate of their spiritual home.

In the summer of 2012, R.S.C. Anderlecht carried out work to bring the stadium up to UEFA standards. Its capacity was thus decreased to 21,500 seats but it offers more comfort, more security, as well as new VIP areas and a brand new press room. All seats in the stadium are now equipped with a backrest. During European competitions, the stadium is all-seated, which decreases even more its capacity.

In 2019, the stadium was officially rebranded as the Lotto Park, for sponsorship reasons.

Location and features
The stadium is located at 2, Avenue Théo Verbeeck/Théo Verbeecklaan, near Saint-Guidon/Sint-Guido metro station. Rival supporters must stop at Aumale metro station for UEFA Champions League matches due to security measures. The stadium hosts a former one-star restaurant (Le Saint-Guidon) and a cafeteria, as well as the official club fanshop and ticketing booths.

References

Notes

External links

 Stadium Guide Article
 Stadium Database Article
 Images of the expansion of the stadium at Jaspers-Eyers Architects

Sports venues completed in 1917
UEFA Euro 1972 stadiums
Football venues in Brussels
Anderlecht
R.S.C. Anderlecht